Pseudoeurycea aquatica, which has been given the common name of aquatic salamander is a species of salamander in the family Plethodontidae. It is endemic to Mexico and only known from its type locality in the Sierra Madre de Oaxaca near Totontepec Villa de Morelos, Oaxaca. 

It lives aquatically in streams, the only plethodontid salamander in Mesoamerica to do so. It is only known from three specimens collected in 1978, and the original habitat has been completely destroyed. Subsequent searches have been unsuccessful, and the species is likely to be extinct.

References

aquatica
Amphibians described in 2001
Taxa named by David B. Wake
Taxa named by Jonathan A. Campbell
Endemic amphibians of Mexico
Fauna of the Sierra Madre de Oaxaca
Taxonomy articles created by Polbot